P.C.Lalhlimthara (born 15 March 1989) is an Indian footballer who currently plays for Shillong Lajong F.C. in the I-League.

Career

Shillong Lajong

2011-12
The 2011-12 football year got off to a good start for Lalhlimthara as he made his debut for Shillong Lajong F.C. in the 2011 Indian Federation Cup against Mohun Bagan and he even scored in that match in the 43rd minute as Lajong won 3-1 on 19 September 2011. He then scored a brace in his second I-League appearance against Sporting Clube de Goa on 31 October 2011.

Career statistics

Club
Statistics accurate as of 11 November 2011

References

Indian footballers
1989 births
Living people
I-League players
Footballers from Mizoram
Association football midfielders
Shillong Lajong FC players